Stephanie Elaine Watson is an American children's book author.

Education 
Watson graduated from Sarah Lawrence College in 2001.

Bibliography

Novels 
 Elvis & Olive (Scholastic Press, 2008) 
 Elvis & Olive: Super Detectives (Scholastic Press, 2010)

Picture books 
 The Wee Hours, illustrated by Mary GrandPré (Disney-Hyperion, 2013)
 Behold! A Baby, illustrated by Joy Ang (Bloomsbury, 2015)
 Best Friends in the Universe, illustrated by LeUyen Pham (Scholastic, 2018)

Awards and honors 
 Best Friends in the Universe was a 2019 Minnesota Book Award finalist.
 Behold! A Baby was a 2016 Minnesota Book Award finalist.
 Elvis & Olive and Elvis & Olive: Super Detectives were both Junior Library Guild selections.

References

External links 

 Stephanie Watson's author website

American children's writers
Sarah Lawrence College alumni
Year of birth missing (living people)
Living people